CHLB-FM is a Canadian radio station that broadcasts a country format at 95.5 FM in Lethbridge, Alberta. CHLB is currently owned by the Jim Pattison Group.

History

The station originally began broadcasting in 1959 as CHEC at 1090 AM. It was owned by Southern Alberta Broadcasting, which later became a subsidiary of Shaw Communications. Notable radio personalities during this period included Bryan Fustukian, broadcasting as Vik Armen.

From 1985 to 1992, Tim Hitchner worked as a radio DJ at the station. In 1986, Hitchner and other employees at CHEC created and recorded Brocket 99, a controversial comedy tape, at the station's studios.

The station was acquired by Monarch Broadcasting in 1993. It changed its call sign to CKRX later that same year, adopting new branding as 1090 Rocks. The station moved to its current frequency 95.5 FM in 1996, and adopted its current call sign and format in 1997.

Monarch Broadcasting was acquired by Pattison in 2000.

In October 2022, the station rebranded as Wild 95.5, taking its name from Calgary sister station CKWD-FM.

References

External links 
 Wild 95.5
 
 

Hlb
Hlb
Hlb
Radio stations established in 1959
1959 establishments in Alberta